Qarah Gonay-e Sofla (also Romanized as Qarah Gonay-e Soflá; also known as Qarah Gūnī-ye Soflá) is a village in Charuymaq-e Sharqi Rural District, Shadian District, Charuymaq County, East Azerbaijan Province, Iran. At the 2006 census, its population was 230, in 39 families.

References 

Populated places in Charuymaq County